The Saugus River is a river in Massachusetts.

It has at least eight tributaries: the Mill River; Bennets Pond Brook; the Pines River; Hawkes Brook; Crystal Pond Brook; Beaver Dam Brook; Strawberry Brook; and Shute Brook.

Although Native Americans called the river Aboutsett ("winding stream"), European settlers first called it the River at Saugus, where Saugus (possibly a native word for "long") arguably named the beach running from Swampscott to Revere (there are competing theories as to the origin of the word "Saugus"). In early European times, alewives and bass were harvested from 1632 onwards. The Saugus Iron Works used water power from the river in by 1642, and the river subsequently attracted grist mills, chocolate mills, wool and flannel mills, and a tannery.

References 
 Saugus River Watershed Council
 "A Gathering of Memories: Saugus 1900-2000" by John Burns, Tom Sheehan, et al.;  2000, Jostens / Saugus.net, ; http://www.saugus.org/GatheringOfMemories/ (Provides at least three conflicting theories as to the origin of the name "Saugus")

Rivers of Essex County, Massachusetts
Wakefield, Massachusetts
Saugus, Massachusetts
Rivers of Massachusetts